Edward Davies House is a historic home located at Caernarvon Township in Lancaster County, Pennsylvania. It was built about 1805, and is a -story, "T"-shaped stone dwelling with a gable roof in the Federal style.  It has three sections: the two bay eastern section that was originally Davies shop; the three bay western section that was originally his dwelling; and the rear "Old Kitchen" section.

It was listed on the National Register of Historic Places in 1991.

References 

Houses on the National Register of Historic Places in Pennsylvania
Federal architecture in Pennsylvania
Houses completed in 1805
Houses in Lancaster County, Pennsylvania
1805 establishments in Pennsylvania
National Register of Historic Places in Lancaster County, Pennsylvania